Jerome E. Groopman has been a staff writer in medicine and biology for The New Yorker since 1998.  He is also the Dina and Raphael Recanati Chair of Medicine at Harvard Medical School, Chief of Experimental Medicine at Beth Israel Deaconess Medical Center, and author of five books, all written for a general audience.  He has published approximately 150 scientific articles and has written several Op-Ed pieces on medicine for The New York Times, The Washington Post, and The New Republic.

Career
Groopman received his BA and MD from Columbia University and was at the Massachusetts General Hospital for his internship and residency in internal medicine. This was followed by fellowships in hematology and oncology at the University of California Los Angeles and the Dana–Farber Cancer Institute in Boston.

Much of Groopman's research has focused on the basic mechanisms of cancer and AIDS.  He did seminal work on identifying growth factors which may restore the depressed immune systems of AIDS patients.  He performed the first clinical trials in a technique that augments blood cell production in immunodeficient HIV-infected patients and has been a major participant in the development of many AIDS-related therapies including AZT.  Recently, Groopman has extended the research infrastructure in genetics and cell biology to studies in breast cancer and neurobiology.

Popular science works
The first book written by Groopman was The Measure of Our Days, published in 1997.  He also published Second Opinions in 2000 and Anatomy of Hope in 2004. His 2007 book How Doctors Think rapidly rose to the top of the New York Times bestseller list when it was released. He further wrote, with his wife, Pamela Hartzband, an endocrinologist, the book Your Medical Mind (2011). Groopman was the guest editor for the 2008 edition of the yearly anthology The Best American Science and Nature Writing.

In popular culture
The lead character in the 2000 TV series Gideon's Crossing, played by Andre Braugher, was loosely based on Groopman and his book The Measure of Our Days.

Bibliography

Books

Essays and reporting

References

External links

Jerome Groopman’s biography

NPR interview with Dr. Groopman
PBS interview with Dr. Groopman
 How Doctors Think By Jerome Groopman - Review
 Interview about How Doctors Think, online at CBC Words at Large
Groopman author page and article archive from The New York Review of Books

American oncologists
American medical writers
American male non-fiction writers
Jewish American writers
Columbia University Vagelos College of Physicians and Surgeons alumni
Massachusetts General Hospital residents
The New Yorker staff writers
University of California, San Francisco alumni
Harvard Medical School faculty
Living people
Year of birth missing (living people)
Charles H. Revson Foundation
21st-century American Jews
Columbia College (New York) alumni
Members of the National Academy of Medicine